Ribby-with-Wrea is a civil parish also electoral ward in the Borough of Fylde and ceremonial county of Lancashire in England.  It had a population of 1,489 in 2001, reducing to 1,373 at the 2011 Census. The parish includes Ribby Hall and the village of Wrea Green.

See also
Listed buildings in Ribby-with-Wrea

References

Civil parishes in Lancashire
Geography of the Borough of Fylde